Plasmodium bucki is a parasite of the genus Plasmodium subgenus Vinckeia.As in all Plasmodium species, P. bucki has both vertebrate and insect hosts. The vertebrate hosts for this parasite are mammals.

Description 
The parasite was first described by Landau et al. in 1989.

The infected erythrocyte becomes enlarged and stippled. The stippling resembles Maurer's dots.

The mature schizonts produce 32 merozoites.

Distribution 
This species is found in Madagascar.

Hosts 

The only known host is the lemur Lemur macaco macaco.

References 

bucki